Minuscule 806 (in the Gregory-Aland numbering), ε3036 (von Soden), is a Greek minuscule manuscript of the New Testament written on parchment. Palaeographically it has been assigned to the 14th century. It contains liturgical books and marginalia. The manuscript is lacunose.

Description 
The codex contains the text of the four Gospels, on 368 parchment leaves (size ).

The text is written in one column per page, 22 lines per page.

Numbers of the Ammonian Sections are given only at the beginning of lessons (in Mark 234, the last section in 16:9). It has not references to the Eusebian Canons.

Text 
The Greek text of the codex is a representative of the Byzantine text-type. Hermann von Soden included it to the textual family Kr. Aland placed it in Category V.

According to the Claremont Profile Method it represents Kr it represents textual family Kr in Luke 1 and Luke 10. In Luke 20 it represents Kx.

History 
According to Gregory the manuscript was written in the 14th century. The manuscript is currently dated by the INTF to the 14th century.

It was added to the list of New Testament manuscripts by Gregory (806e). Gregory saw the manuscript in 1886.

The manuscript is now housed at the library of the Hellenic Parliament (3) in Athens.

See also 

 List of New Testament minuscules
 Biblical manuscript
 Textual criticism
 Minuscule 805

References

Further reading 

 

Greek New Testament minuscules
14th-century biblical manuscripts